Mervin Thomas "Bud" Connolly (May 25, 1901 – June 12, 1964) was a shortstop in Major League Baseball who played for the Boston Red Sox in the 1925 season. Connolly batted and threw right-handed. He was born in San Francisco, California.

In a 43-game career, Connolly was a .262 hitter (28-for-107) with 12 runs, seven doubles, and one triple without home runs.

Connolly died in Berkeley, California, at the age of 63.

External links

Boston Red Sox players
Major League Baseball shortstops
Baseball players from California
1901 births
1964 deaths